EDC or EdC may refer to:

Education 
 East Devon College, in Tiverton, Devon, England
 EDC Paris Business School, a French business school
 Education Development Center, an American educational organization
 Department for Education (South Australia)#Education Development Centre, conference centre run by the South Australian Department for Education

Entertainment
 EDC, a 1994 album by the band Satchel
 Electric Daisy Carnival, a music festival
 Entertainment Distribution Company, a music distribution center
 Étienne de Crécy (born 1969), a French DJ and producer
 Eurovision Dance Contest

Government and politics 
 Christian Democratic Team of the Spanish State, a defunct political party in Spain
 Democratic Left of Catalonia, a defunct political party in Spain
 Dubai Export Development Corporation
 Expediency Discernment Council of the Government of Iran
 Export Development Canada, Canada's export credit agency
 European Defence Community, a proposed pan-European defense force in the 1950s
 European Documentation Centre, of the European Commission

Science and medicine 
 1-Ethyl-3-(3-dimethylaminopropyl)carbodiimide, a water-soluble carbodiimide
 Electrodesiccation and curettage, a medical procedure commonly performed by dermatologists
 Endocrine disruptor chemical, compounds disturbing hormone systems of animals
 Epidermal differentiation complex, a gene complex comprising over fifty genes
 Estradiol dicypionate, an estrogen ester
 Estimated date of confinement, the estimated date of delivery for a pregnant woman
 Ethylene dichloride, a colourless liquid with a chloroform-like odour
 Extensor digitorum communis, a muscle of the posterior forearm of humans and other animals

Technology 
 Electronic data capture
 Electronic Diesel Control, a control system for diesel engines
 Error detecting code

Other uses 
 Austin Executive Airport, in Texas, United States
 Digital Research European Development Centre, former Digital Research development centre in Hungerford, UK from 1986 to 1991
 Economic development committee, a subordinate body to the National Economic Development Council in the United Kingdom
 Economic development corporation
 Electricidad de Caracas, the integrated electricity company for Caracas, Venezuela
 Energy Development Corporation, a renewable energy company in the Philippines
 European Drift Championship, a motorsport championship in the United Kingdom
 Everyday carry, various survival and weaponry items
 Novell European Development Centre, former Novell development centre in Hungerford, UK from 1991 to 1997